Paul McKee may refer to:
 Paul McKee (developer), St. Louis, Missouri-area property developer
 Paul McKee (athlete) (born 1977), Irish sprint athlete
 Paul McKee (author) (1898–1974), scholar and author of children's books
 Paul McKee (American football) (1923–1999), American football end